Nux Vomica is the second album by The Veils, released on 18 September 2006. It was recorded in Laurel Canyon (Los Angeles) and produced by Nick Launay, during spring of 2006. A far heavier and darker sound characterises Nux Vomica, very different from the indie sound of the previous record. Most notable are "Jesus for the Jugular", "Not Yet", "Pan" and the title track itself, while more accessible numbers are the singles "Advice for Young Mothers to Be" and "One Night on Earth". A distinctive contribution to this new sound was given by the string arrangements of Jane Scarpantoni, ex member of The Lounge Lizards and long-time Lou Reed collaborator.

Track list 

All songs written by Finn Andrews, except where noted.

CD/LP (RTRADCD235/RTRADLP235)
 "Not Yet" – 4:54
 "Calliope!" – 3:35 (Andrews/Gerrard)
 "Advice for Young Mothers to Be" – 3:25
 "Jesus for the Jugular" – 4:46
 "Pan" – 4:58
 "A Birthday Present" – 3:43
 "Under the Folding Branches" – 3:23
 "Nux Vomica" – 5:30
 "One Night on Earth" – 4:08
 "House Where We All Live" – 5:06

Enhanced CD (RTD002)
 "Not Yet" – 4:54
 "Calliope!" – 3:35 (Andrews/Gerrard)
 "Advice for Young Mothers to Be" – 3:25
 "Jesus for the Jugular" – 4:46
 "Pan" – 4:58
 "A Birthday Present" – 3:43
 "Under the Folding Branches" – 3:23
 "Nux Vomica" – 5:30
 "One Night on Earth" – 4:08
 "House Where We All Live" – 5:06
 "Night Thoughts of a Tired Surgeon" – 2:51
 "Advice for Young Mothers to Be" (Video)

Japan Edition (POCE-15001/4988005453860)
 "Not Yet" – 4:54
 "Calliope!" – 3:35 (Andrews/Gerrard)
 "Advice for Young Mothers to Be" – 3:25
 "Night Thoughts of a Tired Surgeon" – 2:51
 "Jesus for the Jugular" – 4:46
 "Pan" – 4:58
 "A Birthday Present" – 3:43
 "Under the Folding Branches" – 3:23
 "Nux Vomica" – 5:30
 "One Night on Earth" – 4:08
 "House Where We All Live" – 5:06

Personnel 

 Finn Andrews – vocals, guitar
 Sophia Burn – bass
 Liam Gerrard – piano, organ, harmonium
 Henning Dietz – drums, percussion
 Dan Raishbrook – guitar
 Eric Gorfain – violin
 Jane Scarpantoni – cello
 Janubia and Natalie Wilde – backing vocals

References

2006 albums
Albums produced by Nick Launay
Gothic rock albums by English artists
Indie rock albums by English artists
Pop albums by English artists
Rough Trade Records albums
The Veils albums